Lady Rose may refer to:

 Lady Rose (guitar model), a Fender Stratocaster
 "Lady Rose" (song), a song by Mungo Jerry
 MV Lady Rose, a small coastal vessel, which operated on the coast of British Columbia, Canada
 Vivien Rose, Lady Rose of Colmworth, UK Supreme Court judge